Florida State University School (FSUS) is a laboratory school located in Tallahassee, Florida, United States.  It is sponsored by Florida State University and works in close collaboration with the Florida State University College of Education. The school is often referred to as Florida High School, or "Florida High", though it actually serves grades kindergarten through 12th.

History
The school was founded in 1857 as the Primary Department of the Florida Institute, and from 1954 until 2001, was located on the FSU campus. However, the university's interest in building a medical school at Florida High's location necessitated the school moving off campus. In 2001, the new Florida High building in Southwood was opened.

Relationship with FSU
FSUS is sponsored by Florida State University and is a demonstration school for the FSU College of Education, which is used for exploring teaching techniques as well as being an education center where teachers may observe and participate in best teacher practices; and a vehicle for the dissemination of research findings. FSUS and the FSU College of Education collaborate for research, observations, etc. as well as Florida State University, Tallahassee Community College, and Florida A&M University.

After the school's relocation to Southwood, there was some consideration of the school severing its ties with the university.  However, that proposal was rejected by Florida High's faculty.

Student body
Florida High has approximately 1700 students that represent Florida's population demographics. The school has programs in the academics, as well as art, foreign language, and athletic programs.

Sports
In 2007, Florida High's girls basketball team defeated Parkway High School to win the 3A State Championship. That same year, Florida High's football team posted a perfect regular season record including a 40-0 shutout of Leon County High School. The school's mascot were the "Demons", but were renamed after the Florida State Seminoles in 1995.

Notable alumni

Caroline Alexander — Author and journalist
Brett Blizzard (Class of 1999) — Professional basketball player in Italy
Link Jarrett (Class of 1990) – Former professional baseball player and current head baseball coach at Florida State.
Brandon Jenkins (Class of 2009) – American football player
Dr. Will Kirby (Class of 1991) – Celebrity dermatologist, medical authority, winner of Big Brother and star of Dr. 90210
Martin Mayhew (Class of 1983) – American football player and executive in the National Football League (NFL)
John W. Olsen (Class of 1973) - Regents' Professor Emeritus of Anthropology, University of Arizona; archaeologist and explorer of Central Asia
Dean Palmer – Professional baseball player in Major League Baseball (MLB)
Diane Roberts - Author and commentator 
Khaneshia  KJ Smith (Class of 2003) – Actress  
David Ross (Class of 1995) - MLB catcher, two-time World Series champion, 2017 Dancing with the Stars runner-up, Chicago Cubs manager
Ronnie Harrison (Class of 2015) - American football player
Garrett McGhin (Class of 2014) - American football player

References

External links

Educational institutions established in 1857
Schools in Tallahassee, Florida
Public K-12 schools in Florida
Florida State University
High schools in Leon County, Florida
Charter schools in Florida
1857 establishments in Florida
Laboratory schools in the United States